Presumed Guilty! is a 1989 video game published by Cosmi.

Gameplay
Presumed Guilty! is a game in which in the then-future of 1996, and the player's first case for the new world-wide computer police network Copnet is investigating the death of Ray Lamonte, who had just received an award for his work in satellite laser weapons.

Reception
Scorpia reviewed the game for Computer Gaming World, and stated that "The sloppiness in this game shows throughout, from the errors in the manual through the utilities that don't work properly to the numerous typos and misspellings in the text, the incessant noise of the game (no way to turn off the sound), and the final crash at the end. What might have been a reasonably good game is made frustrating and unenjoyable by the lack of adequate quality control."

Reviews
ASM (Aktueller Software Markt) - Jan, 1990
The Games Machine (UK) - Feb, 1990

References

External links
Review in Info

1989 video games
Commodore 64 games
Criminal law video games
Detective video games
DOS games
Mystery video games
Puzzle video games
Single-player video games
Video games about police officers
Video games developed in the United States
Video games set in 1996
Video games set in the future
Video games set in the United States